Michèle Bokanowski (born 9 August 1943) is a French composer. She was born in Cannes, and was educated in traditional music. She continued her studies in composition in Paris with Michel Puig and in electronic music in 1970 at the Service de la recherche de l’ORTF (ORTF) directed by Pierre Schaeffer. She also studied computer music at the Faculté de Vincennes and electronic music with Eliane Radigue.

After completing her studies, Bokanowski worked as a composer. She married Patrick Bokanowski and often collaborates with him for film, Catheringe Dasté for theater works, and choreographers Hideyuki Yano, Marceline Lartigue and Bernardo Montet for dance.

Works
Bokanowski composes for concert performance, film, television, theatre  and dance. Selected works include:
Korè for one pianist
Trois chambres d’inquiétude
Tabou
Chant d’ombre
Cirque

She has composed soundtracks for films including:
2008 Battements solaires (short)
2002 Le canard à l'orange (short)
1998 Flammes (short)
1998 Fugue (short)
1994 Au bord du lac (short)
1992 The Beach (short)
1984 La part du hasard
1982 The Angel
1974 Déjeuner du matin (short)
1972 The Woman Who Powders Herself (short)

Her work has been recorded and released on CD, including:
L'Ange (CD, Album) trAce, 2003	
L'Étoile Absinthe / Chant D'Ombre (CD, Ltd) Optical Sound, 2010	
Tabou (CD, Mini) Metamkine, 1992	
Trois Chambres D'Inquiétude (CD, Ltd, EP), Elevator Bath, 2000	
L'Étoile Absinthe (CD, Mini) Metamkine, 2002	
Cirque (CD) Empreintes DIGITALes, 1995	
Pour Un Pianiste (CD) trAce, 2005	
Michèle Bokanowski (CD) trAce, 2009

References

External links
Interview with Michèle Bokanowski

1943 births
Living people
People from Cannes
20th-century classical composers
French classical composers
French women classical composers
Women in electronic music
20th-century French women musicians
20th-century French composers
20th-century women composers
French film score composers
French women film score composers